The Ajax Pickering Transit Authority (APTA) was a public transit operator in the Town of Ajax, Ontario, Canada, and the City of Pickering. It was merged with the other public transit agencies in Durham Region on January 1, 2006 to form Durham Region Transit.

APTA was jointly owned by Pickering and Ajax and governed by members of the Authority appointed by both municipalities.

Routes
The following routes were operated:
Industrial
Liverpool
Amberlea
Glendale
West Shore
Bay Ridges
Rosebank
Rouge Hill Shuttle
Ajax
Finch/Highway 2
Brock Road
Maple Ridge
Beach
Westney
Shoal Point
Nottingham
Harwood
Duffins
Elm
Village
Puckrin
Applecroft
Flag Bus 1,2,3

History
APTA was created on September 4, 2001 from the merger of Pickering Transit and Ajax Transit.  It operated until the creation of Durham Region Transit in 2006.

Fleet

The following was APTA's roster at its dissolution on December 31, 2005:

External links
 Drawings and photos of APTA (Ajax-Pikering Transit Authority) buses

Transit agencies in Ontario
2001 establishments in Ontario
2006 disestablishments in Ontario
Transport in Pickering, Ontario
Transport in Ajax, Ontario
History of transport in the Regional Municipality of Durham